Christina Rosenvinge Hepworth (born 29 May 1964) is a Spanish singer.

A veteran of the music industry with a career spanning more than thirty years she was a member of the Spanish groups Alex y Christina and Christina y Los Subterráneos, which were very popular bands before she started a much more risky solo career. Rosenvinge has spoken about facing sexism within the industry and is a vocal critic of it. Lee Ranaldo, the guitarist of Sonic Youth produced one of her albums right before she moved to New York City in 1999. She recorded three albums in english edited by Smells Like Records before moving back to Spain where she has become a revered artist. She is considered "one of the voices of reference of Spanish music in this first decade of the 21st century." In 2018, she had been honoured with Premio Nacional de las Musicas Actuales.

Rosenvinge tours regularly in Spain, Mexico and South America. It was in a trip to Huacho, Peru, that she wrote her song  "La Tejedora".

Discography

With Alex y Christina 
Alex y Christina (1987)
El ángel y el diablo (1989)

With Christina y Los Subterráneos 
Que me parta un rayo (1992)
Mi pequeño animal (1994)

Solo 
Cerrado (1997)
Flores raras (1998)
Frozen Pool (16 January 2001) Smells Like Records
Foreign Land (2002)
Continental 62 (20 February 2006)
 Alguien que cuide de mí – Grandes éxitos (2007)
Verano fatal (2007) with Nacho Vegas
Tu labio superior (2008)
Tu labio inferior (2008)
La joven Dolores (2011)
Un caso sin resolver (2011)
Lo nuestro (2015)
Un hombre rubio (2018)

References

External links 
About Christina 
Official website

Alternative rock guitarists
Alternative rock singers
Spanish guitarists
Spanish singer-songwriters
1964 births
Living people
Women rock singers
Indie rock musicians
Spanish women musicians
Spanish women singer-songwriters
Spanish rock singers
Spanish television presenters
English-language singers from Spain
Rock en Español musicians
Spanish people of Danish descent
Spanish people of English descent
Singers from Madrid
20th-century guitarists
21st-century guitarists
20th-century Spanish singers
21st-century Spanish singers
20th-century Spanish women singers
21st-century Spanish women singers
Spanish women television presenters
20th-century women guitarists
21st-century women guitarists